The Pagsanjan Gorge National Park is a national park and tourist zone located in the province of Laguna in the Philippines, approximately  southeast of Manila. It protects an area of  around a series of gorges on the Bumbungan River which leads to Pagsanjan Falls. It is one of the oldest parks in the country and one of two protected areas in Laguna. It is situated in the municipalities of Pagsanjan, Cavinti and Lumban.

History
The park was first established in 1904 through Executive Order No. 33 signed by Civil Governor Luke Edward Wright. The Caliraya Falls Reserve covered  and was initially set aside for the development of water power from the falls of the Caliraya River. In 1939, through Proclamation No. 392 signed by President Manuel Luis Quezon, the reserve was reclassified and renamed to Pagsanjan Gorge National Park with its area further reduced to its present size.

The national park was declared a tourist zone in 1976 with the administration and control transferred to the Philippine Tourism Authority.

See also
 List of national parks of the Philippines

References

National parks of the Philippines
Geography of Laguna (province)
Tourist attractions in Laguna (province)
Protected areas established in 1904
1904 establishments in the Philippines